Rahîm Er (born April 12, 1950 in Harput, Elazığ, Turkey) is a Turkish author and lawyer, and a daily columnist for Türkiye daily.

Biography
After finishing Adana Erkek Lisesi in 1969, he graduated from the Faculty of Law of Istanbul University in 1974. He is a member of the Istanbul Bar Association and the Union of Turkish Bar Associations. In 1976 he joined Türkiye daily newspaper and started to write daily columns. Er was the founding general manager of Türkiye Çocuk, a weekly magazine for children; TGRT, a national Turkish television channel which was bought by Fox Broadcasting Company and changed to its current name Fox Türkiye; and İhlas Databank, which was the basis for ihlas.net, one of the first Internet service providers in Turkey. He hosted television and radio programs on TGRT and TGRT FM from 1996. He was also the chairman of board of BKY-Babıali Kültür Yayıncılığı A.Ş from 12 November 1999 until 15 April 2013.

Rahîm Er is the author of books entitled Sevgili Peygamberim, İmparatorluk Coğrafyasında Diplomasi Koşturmak, Örsteki Ülke Türkiye, Hayatın Rengi İnsan and Osmanlı Milletler Topluluğu. He currently has a column which is entitled İmza (English: The Signature) in Türkiye daily newspaper.

In 2008, Er was prosecuted under Article 301 of the Turkish Penal Code due to his opinions criticising the Court of Cassation of Turkey. Even though he was criticising the length of trials, heavy backlog, and its hidden resistance to the establishment of regional courts of appeals in Turkey, Er was charged with insulting an institution of the Republic of Turkey by chief public prosecutor's office in Bakırköy, Istanbul. However, since a series of revisions were made on the Article 301 on April 30, 2008, including a new amendment which makes it obligatory to get the approval of the minister of justice to file a case regarding the Article 301, this prosecution was struck out by the dismissal of the minister of justice.

References

External links
 Biography of Rahîm Er at Biyografi.net 

1950 births
People from Elazığ
Istanbul University Faculty of Law alumni
Turkish writers
Turkish columnists
Living people